NitrosBase is a Russian
high-performance multi-model database system. The database system supports relational, graph and document database models.

History 

The developer initially implemented the database as a triplestore, being a Semantic Web pioneer in Russia.  Remodelling into a multi-model database was supported by the Skolkovo Innovation Center in 2017.
The database is used in information systems that support the health-care reform in modern Russia.

Characteristics 

In NitrosBase, all data are stored in the format of the internal graph model, while data in other models are their views (representations; similar to SQL views). Regardless of the model in which format data were imported, it is possible to query them using the same query language thereby uniformly addressing data imported in different models.

Moreover, it is possible to query data in any model using query language that is native for that model. NitrosBase supports the following languages:

 SQL (with elements of object syntax) – for querying data in relational view;
 SPARQL and Gremlin-style language Graph-it – for querying data in graph view;
 JSONiq and MongoDB Query – for querying data in document view.

Implementation details 

The internal graph model is close to RDF* which is used in Blazegraph and Amazon Neptune. That allows it to treat the internal data graph both as RDF graph and as Property Graph, performing queries both in SPARQL and Gremlin-style languages.

Instead of indexes based on B+-trees traditionally used in graph databases, NitrosBase uses a sparse link index of its own devising. Another source of performance gain is storage optimization on the physical level in order to reduce the number of random access operations.

Like memSQL, NitrosBase translates a query into C++ code.

Awards and achievements 

Nitrosbase-derived product MS SQL Server Accelerator was awarded first prize at the Silicon Valley Open Doors conference in 2009 and named "startup of the day" of the Microsoft BizSpark program on 3 March 2010.

References

External links 

 Official website

Graph databases
Document-oriented databases
Relational database management systems
Proprietary database management systems